The term mathematical theory may refer to:
Theory (mathematical logic), a collection of sentences in a formal language.
Mathematical theory, a branch of mathematics

See also
Theory